Badum is a surname. Notable people with the surname include:

 Johann Badum (1921–1943), German Luftwaffe military aviator during World War II
 Lisa Badum (born 1983), German politician